Progress in Human Geography is a bimonthly peer-reviewed academic journal that covers the field of human geography, primarily publishing critical reviews of current research. The journal's editor-in-chief is Noel Castree. It was established in 1977 and is currently published by SAGE Publications.

Abstracting and indexing 
 Progress in Human Geography is abstracted and indexed in Scopus and the Social Sciences Citation Index. According to the Journal Citation Reports, its 2014 impact factor is 5.010, ranking it 2 out of 73 journals in the category "Geography".

References

External links 
 

SAGE Publishing academic journals
English-language journals
Geography journals
Bimonthly journals
Publications established in 1977
Environmental social science journals